The Lustron Home No. 02102 is an historic enameled steel prefabricated Lustron house located in Cedar Rapids, Iowa.  It was listed on the National Register of Historic Places in 2004.

In 2004 it was deemed significant as one out of just nine surviving Lustron Homes installed in Cedar Rapids, and out of 143 installed in Iowa.  Per the NRHP nominating document, it is "an example of the Lustron Corporation's innovative contributions to the prefabricated housing industry and its efforts to incorporate modem architecture and the latest domestic technologies into the lives of everyday Americans."

References

Houses completed in 1950
Lustron houses in Iowa
Houses in Cedar Rapids, Iowa
National Register of Historic Places in Cedar Rapids, Iowa
Houses on the National Register of Historic Places in Iowa